The Unified Wine & Grape Symposium (UWGS) is an annual wine and grape industry event, held every January in Sacramento, California, United States of America. Since 1995 the American Society for Enology and Viticulture (ASEV) and the California Association of Winegrape Growers (CAWG) have worked together to develop the trade show combined with symposium. The Unified Symposium also hosts a trade show with over 650 vendors displaying their products and services to the more than 14,000 people who attend annually.

References

External links
 Unified Wine & Grape Symposium
 Economy to be focus of 2010 Unified Wine & Grape Symposium - Wine Industry Report
 Unified Symposium's diverse program reaches every sector of industry - Wine Business Monthly
 Unified Wine and Grape Symposium revealing event - Western Farm Press

Organizations based in California
Food technology organizations
Wine industry organizations
California wine organizations